Zard Fahreh (also known as Zard Nahreh) is a village in Pishkuh-e Mugui Rural District, in the Central District of Fereydunshahr County, Isfahan Province, Iran. At the 2006 census, its population was 206, in 40 families.

References 

Populated places in Fereydunshahr County